Amy Wright is an American actress and former model. She has appeared in such films as The Deer Hunter, Breaking Away,  The Accidental Tourist, Hard Promises, Crossing Delancey, and Miss Firecracker. She is the widow of actor Rip Torn.

Early years 
Born in Chicago, Wright is a graduate of Beloit College.

Career 
Wright acted in summer-stock productions in Rockford, Illinois, before going to New York, where she studied acting with Uta Hagen.  She starred with Eric Schweig in The Scarlet Letter and Tom and Huck (both made in 1995). She produced a Netflix series called The Next Step.

Wright starred in the original production of Breakfast with Les and Bess as Shelby.  Wright also appeared on Broadway in the original productions of Fifth of July and Noises Off.  Wright currently is on the faculty of HB Studio in New York City.

Personal life 
Wright was married to actor Rip Torn from 1989 until his death in 2019, and the couple had two daughters, Katie and Claire Torn.

Filmography

Film

Television

References

External links

Actresses from Chicago
American film actresses
Living people
Beloit College alumni
University of Chicago Laboratory Schools alumni
20th-century American actresses
21st-century American actresses
Year of birth missing (living people)